The non-marine molluscs of Costa Rica are a part of the wildlife of Costa Rica. 233 species and subspecies have been reported (50 freshwater and 183 terrestrial), however scientists estimate that a full inventory can reach up to 300 or 400 species.

The terrestrial gastropods reported for Costa Rica belong to 25 families and 59 genera, and include 11 doubtful identifications. Species are commonly found in paramo and oak forests Samples of the species collected in Costa Rica can be found in the Museum of Zoology of the Universidad de Costa Rica.

The terrestrial malacofauna of Costa Rica presents an endemism of 31% in terrestrial species and 8% in freshwater species. These species can be affected by water pollution, deforestation and the destruction of calcium-rich habitats.

Gastropods 

The land gastropods belong to the class Gastropoda. In Costa Rica the taxonomy of this group is as follows:

Helicinidae (17 subspecies)

Cyclophoridae (15 subspecies)

Diplommatinidae (1 species)
Adelopoma costaricense Bartsch & Morrison, 1942

Carychiidae (1 species)
Carychium exiguum costaricanum

Achatinellidae (2 species)
Tornatellina biolleyi Martens, 1902
Tornatellina pittieri Martens, 1898

Vertiginidae (3 species)
Gastrocopta gularis Thompson & López, 1996
Nesopupa cocosensis Dall, 1900
Pupisoma dioscoricola C.B. Adams, 1845

Orthalicidae (30 species)

Urocoptidae (1 species)
Microceramus concisus Morelet, 1849

Subulinidae (23 species)

Spiraxidae (33 species)

Systrophiidae (5 species)

Helicodiscidae (2 species)
Chanomphalus pilsbryi (Baker, 1922)
Radiodiscus millecostatus costaricanus Pilsbry, 1926

Charopidae (1 species)
Rotadiscus pilsbryi Rehder, 1942

Succineidae (5 species)

Helicarionidae (15 species)

Zonitidae (6 species)

Limacidae (1 species)
Deroceras laeve (Müller, 1774)

Polygyridae (1 species)
Praticolella griseola (Pfr., 1891)

Thysanophoridae (2 species)
*Microconus wilhelmi (Pfr., 1866)
Thysanophora costaricensis Rehder, 1942

Camaenidae  (4 species)
Labyrinthus quadridentatus quadridentatus (Broderip, 1832)
Labyrinthus quadridentatus biolleyi Solem, 1966
Labyrinthus triplicatus (Martens, 1868)
Solaropsis tiloriensis (Angas, 1879)

Helicidae (1 species)
Cornu aspersum = Helix aspersa Müller, 1774

Helminthoglyptidae  (8 species)

Arionidae (1 species)
Ariolimax costaricensis Cockerell, 1890

Philomycidae (1 species)
Pallifera costaricensis (Mörch, 1857)

Veronicellidae (2 species)
Diplosolenodes occidentalis (Guilding, 1825)
Sarasinula plebeia (Fischer, 1868)

Incertae sedis
Hyalinia glomerula Martens, 1892
Hyalinia permodesta minor Martens, 1892

Bivalvia
Some bivalves can be found in freshwater ecosystems.

See also
List of amphibians of Costa Rica
List of birds of Costa Rica
List of mammals of Costa Rica
List of non-marine molluscs of Nicaragua
List of reptiles of Costa Rica

References

External links 
 Land snails (14 species) at website by Instituto Nacional de Biodiversidad (INBio)
 , PDF.
 Barrientos Z. (2010). "Los moluscos terrestres (Mollusca: Gastropoda) de Costa Rica: clasificación, distribución y conservación". Revista de Biología Tropical 58(4): 1165–1175. PDF.

Costa Rica
Molluscs
Costa Rica
Costa Rica
Costa Rica